Sazar is a village in Paddar tehsil of Kishtwar district in the union territory of Jammu and Kashmir, India.

Demographics
According to the 2011 census of India, Sazar has 102 households. The literacy rate of Sazar village was 45.45% compared to 67.16% of Jammu and Kashmir. In Sazar, Male literacy stands at 60.89% while the female literacy rate was 26.37%.

References

Villages in Kishtwar district